The 2009 Coupe de la Ligue Final was the 15th final in this young cup's history. The final was played at the Stade de France in Paris on 25 April 2009 was contested between FC Girondins de Bordeaux of Ligue 1 and Vannes OC of Ligue 2. This was the first meeting between the two clubs. This was Bordeaux's fifth appearance in the final having won in 2002 and 2007 and losing in the 1997 and 1998 editions of the cup. This was Vannes's first ever appearance in the cup final. With their appearance, Vannes were the first ever club to reach the final after beginning from the 1st round. Bordeaux won the match 4–0 after getting off to a fast start scoring their first three goals inside of 13 minutes.

Match Report
Bordeaux got off to a fast start, in all aspects of the match, scoring in just the 2nd minute with the Brazilian Wendel chipping the ball over Vannes keeper Christophe Revel. Bordeaux then tripled their lead in a span of two minutes with Marc Planus scoring on a header off a corner kick from Wendel in the 10th minute and Yoan Gouffran scoring just his second goal for Bordeaux in the 12th minute off a free kick from Yoann Gourcuff, though the latter was first credited with the goal. However, after looking at the replay, it was determined that Gouffran got a slight head on the ball redirecting it slightly. Gourcuff would get his goal in the 40th minute scoring on a right footed shot just outside the box. The ball deflected off a Vannes defender before going into the back off the net. This goal gave Bordeaux a 4–0 lead heading into halftime.

Route to the final

Final summary

Notes

External links 
 Coupe de la Ligue Results

2008–09 in French football
2008-09
Coupe De La Ligue Final 2009
April 2009 sports events in France
Sport in Saint-Denis, Seine-Saint-Denis
Football competitions in Paris
2009 in Paris